The  (Mass for the time of Lent), Klafsky 1:19, is a mass without a Gloria by Michael Haydn. It is suitable also for Advent.

History 

Michael Haydn composed the mass as a director of music in Salzburg under archbishop Colloredo. According to a recording's notes, the "Missa is perfectly in accord with the then current ideals for reform in the Catholic Church: functional, short, simple, modest and linked to the Gregorian tradition."

Scoring and structure 

The autograph is titled: "" (Mass for Lent for four voices, with organ by Giov. Michele Haydn).  In the following table of the movements, the markings, keys and time signatures are taken from the choral score of the Carus edition, using the symbol for alla breve (2/2).

Publication 

The mass was first published around 1820, possibly 1827, in Augsburg by Anton Böhme, titled Missa in tempore Adventus et Quadragesimae and supplemented by J. Eybler, who added a Gloria and a second Et incarnatus. It appeared in Vienna in 1915, edited by Anton Maria Klafsky, in Denkmäler der Tonkunst in Österreich, volume 45, by the Österreichischer Bundesverlag.

Recordings 

The mass was recorded in 2006 by the Ex Tempore choir, conducted by Florian Heyerick, together with other works by the composer. A review notes its "beautiful, concise soberness unlike anything in the Mozart oeuvre or that of anyone else", pointing at the section "Et incarnatus est" which is free in tempo, similar to harmonized chant. The mass was recorded in 2008 by the Purcell Choir, conducted by György Vashegyi, combined with other lenten music by the composer, titled Sacred music for the season of Lent. A reviewer notes the homophonic setting and simple rhythm, resulting in a floating meditative sound.

References

Sources 
 
 Johann Michael Haydn: Missa Tempore Quadragesimae Carus-Verlag
 Missa tempore Quadragesimae : MH 553 (1794) : à 4 voci in pieno, col'organo : per coro SATB, organo e violone / Michael Haydn ; herausgegeben von Charles H. Sherman. franklin.library.upenn.edu

Compositions by Michael Haydn
Haydn, Michael
1794 compositions
Compositions in D minor